West Baptiste is a summer village in Alberta, Canada. It is located on the western shore of Baptiste Lake, west of Athabasca.

Demographics 

In the 2016 Census of Population conducted by Statistics Canada, the Summer Village of West Baptiste had a population of 38 living in 19 of its 47 total private dwellings, a  change from its 2011 population of 52.

See also 
List of communities in Alberta
List of summer villages in Alberta
List of resort villages in Saskatchewan

References

External links 

1983 establishments in Alberta
Summer villages in Alberta